Charles H. Stanton (June 29, 1838 – February 10, 1913) was an American farmer and politician from New York.

Life 
Stanton was born on June 29, 1838, in Otselic, New York.

In October 1861, during the American Civil War, Stanton enlisted in the 61st New York Infantry Regiment and was mustered in as a private in Company G. He was promoted to corporal in November 1861. He was discharged for disability from Fairfax Seminary Hospital near Alexandria, Virginia.

After reaching adulthood Stanton spent several years in Smyrna and Plymouth, eventually settling in Norwich. He was a town supervisor for Smyrna for several terms, and was secretary and active business manager of the Chenango County Patrons Fire Relief Association by the time he died. He worked as a farmer.

In 1891, Stanton was elected to the New York State Assembly as a Republican, representing Chenango County. He served in the Assembly in 1892 and 1893.

Stanton attended the Methodist Church. He was a member of the Grand Army of the Republic. In 1863, he married Lucy E. Glazier. They had four daughters, Hattie E. Cushman, Gertrude A. Bull, Mary L. Stewart, and Angie Cushman.

Stanton died at home on February 10, 1913. He was buried in Plymouth.

References

External links 

 The Political Graveyard

1838 births
1913 deaths
People from Norwich, New York
Union Army soldiers
People of New York (state) in the American Civil War
Farmers from New York (state)
19th-century American politicians
Town supervisors in New York (state)
Republican Party members of the New York State Assembly
Methodists from New York (state)
Burials in New York (state)